Connor Pritchard (born 17 September 1996 in Brisbane, Australia) is an, Australian born, Zimbabwean rugby union player who plays for the Queensland Country in the National Rugby Championship. His playing position is flanker. He was named in the Queensland Country squad for round 1 in 2019. He is also a Zimbabwean international.

Reference list

External links
Ultimate Rugby profile
itsrugby.co.uk profile

1996 births
Australian rugby union players
Zimbabwe international rugby union players
Living people
Rugby union flankers
Rugby union players from Brisbane